"The Wall" is a song recorded by Canadian country music artist Michelle Wright. It was released in 1994 as the second single from her fourth studio album, The Reasons Why. It peaked at number 4 on the RPM Country Tracks chart in January 1995.

Chart performance

Year-end charts

References

1994 singles
Michelle Wright songs
Arista Nashville singles
Songs written by Steve Bogard
Songs written by Rick Giles
1994 songs